The 1930–31 season is FC Barcelona's 32nd in existence, and was their third year in the Primera División. It covers the period from 1930-08-01 to 1931-07-31.

FC Barcelona won the Catalan league for the 17th time, the 2nd in a row, their only title in the season.

First-team squad

Transfers

In

Out

Competitions

La Liga

League table

Results by round

Matches

Copa del Rey

Round of 32

Round of 16

Catalan football championship

League table

Matches

Friendlies

Results

References
BDFutbol
Webdelcule.com

FC Barcelona seasons
Barcelona